is a railway station on the Iida Line in the town of Iijima, Kamiina District, Nagano Prefecture, Japan, operated by Central Japan Railway Company (JR Central).

Lines
Nanakubo Station is served by the Iida Line and is 152.3 kilometers from the starting point of the line at Toyohashi Station.

Station layout
The station consists of one ground-level side platform and one ground-level island platform connected by a level crossing. The station is unattended.

Platforms

Adjacent stations

History
Nanakubo Station opened on 23 July 1918. With the privatization of Japanese National Railways (JNR) on 1 April 1987, the station came under the control of JR Central.

Passenger statistics
In fiscal 2016, the station was used by an average of 159 passengers daily (boarding passengers only).

Surrounding area
Nanakubo Post Office

See also
 List of railway stations in Japan

References

External links

 Nanakubo Station information 

Railway stations in Nagano Prefecture
Railway stations in Japan opened in 1918
Stations of Central Japan Railway Company
Iida Line
Iijima, Nagano